Dysschema forbesi is a moth of the family Erebidae first described by Herbert Druce in 1907. It is found in Brazil.

References

Moths described in 1907
Dysschema